The Maldives Basketball Association, more popularly known as the MBA, was founded on the 12 August 1991. Since its inception, MBA has been actively involved in developing basketball in the Maldives. 

Basketball is second only to football in the Maldives as a game with truly global reach. The goal is to promote the game across the nation instilling the true spirit of sportsmanship amongst the youth. Through various clinics and affiliations with international bodies, MBA has continuously marched forward in achieving its goals. The recent first ever Inter Atoll Tournament is a simple proof of the growing interest of basketball in the remote islands despite the challenges of providing infrastructure and technical assistance across 860km of sea. 

One of the biggest challenges facing MBA is the lack of opportunities to play international basketball due to the very few tournaments held at international level in this region.

External links
MBA Homepage

Basketball in the Maldives
1991 establishments in the Maldives
Sports organizations established in 1991
Basketball governing bodies in Asia